Alex Kazemi (born June 22, 1994) is a Canadian pop artist, author, journalist and chief executive officer of VOID Collective. He is best known as the writer of Pop Magick: A Simple Guide to Bending Your Reality, released in February 2020 with a foreword by Rose McGowan.

Career 
Since 2009, Kazemi has worked and written for multiple publications, including The New York Observer, Dazed Magazine, Thought Catalog, and the Urban Outfitters blog. In 2009, Kazemi worked as managing editor of Prim magazine for three years, working alongside editor-in-chief Kristin Prim. In 2017, Kazemi released a series of Marilyn Manson video ads for the album Heaven Upside Down that were pulled by Manson due to timing. He currently works as a regular contributor at V magazine and editor of his own publication, The Advisor.

Yours Truly, Brad Sela 
In 2013, Kazemi wrote his first novel, titled Yours Truly, Brad Sela. After uploading a 50-page excerpt online, it quickly received attention and reached over 132,000 views. In 2014, he signed a book deal with MTV Books for the manuscript. Kazemi has since taken down the excerpt online. It was planned for publication in 2017, but has remained unreleased.

The Advisor 
In April 2016, Kazemi launched The Advisor, which describes itself as "a new digital platform that features handwritten open letters penned by contemporary male icons to young men". The Advisor has published letters from notable individuals such as Richard Kern, Bruce LaBruce, Justin Tranter, and Moby.

King Kong Magazine 
In 2018, Kazemi was a guest pop editor at King Kong Magazine and guest features editor at King Kong Garçon's first edition.

Personal life 
Alex is demisexual.

Snapchat: Mudditchgirl91 
Oyster premiered his short film live on Snapchat, titled Snapchat: Mudditchgirl91. The film was directed by Kazemi and starred Bella McFadden, who goes by @internetgirl online. The film was reviewed by numerous outlets including Playboy, Paper Magazine, i-D, and Bullett. The film was discussed in Nancy Jo Sales' book, American Girls: Social Media And The Secret Lives Of Teenagers.

Songwriting discography

References

1994 births
Artists from Vancouver
Canadian male artists
Journalists from British Columbia
Living people
Pop artists
Writers from Vancouver
Demisexual people